Nicole may refer to:

People 
 Nicole (name)
 Nicole (American singer) (born 1958), a contestant in season 3 of the American The X Factor 
 Nicole (Chilean singer) (born 1977)
 Nicole (German singer) (born 1964), winner of the 1982 Eurovision Song Contest
 Nicole, Countess of Penthièvre (c. 1424–after 1480)
 Nicole, Duchess of Lorraine (1608–1657), French noblewoman
 Nicole LaRoche, flutist in the band Brulé, releases solo albums as "Nicole"

Storms 
 Tropical Storm Nicole, a number of named tropical and subtropical cyclones
 Tropical Storm Nicole (2010)
 Hurricane Nicole (2016)
 Hurricane Nicole (2022)

Other uses 
 Nicole (film), a 1978 thriller
 Nicole (video game), a visual novel style game
 Nicole, Lot-et-Garonne, a town in France
 “Nicole”, a song by Ween from the 1990 album GodWeenSatan: The Oneness
 Nicole (album), an album by Indonesian singer NIKI

See also
 Nicolle
 Nicoll Highway
 Nichole
 Nicholas (disambiguation)
 Nicola (disambiguation)